Reckless Youth is a 1931 German film directed by Leo Mittler and starring Camilla Horn, Walter Rilla and Alfred Gerasch. It was made by Paramount Pictures at the Joinville Studios in Paris as a remake of the company's American film Manslaughter.

Cast
 Camilla Horn as Lydia Thorne
 Walter Rilla as Dan O'Bannon, Prosecutor
 Alfred Gerasch as Dr. Albee, Lawyer
 Grit Haid as Ellinor
 Hertha von Hagen as Miß Bennett
 Marguerite Roma as Bessie
 Harald Smith
 Jaro Fürth as Pierce
 Elisabeth Bechtel as 1. Aufseherin
 Vera Baranovskaya as
 Eugen Jensen as Morson
 Josef Bunzl as Peters
 Maroth Marothy as Forster
 Emil Ritter as Kommissar

References

Bibliography

External links 
 

1931 films
1931 comedy films
German comedy films
1930s German-language films
Films directed by Leo Mittler
Films shot at Joinville Studios
German black-and-white films
German multilingual films
Films based on works by Alice Duer Miller
1931 multilingual films
1930s German films